The 2015–16 Marist Red Foxes men's basketball team represented Marist College during the 2015–16 NCAA Division I men's basketball season. The Red Foxes, led by second year head coach Mike Maker, played their home games at the McCann Arena and were members of the Metro Atlantic Athletic Conference. They finished the season 7–23 overall, 4–16 in MAAC play to finish in eleventh place. As the #11 seed in the 2016 MAAC tournament, they were defeated in the first round by #6 seed Manhattan 63–81.

Previous season 

The Red Foxes finished the 2014–15 season 7–25, 5–15 in MAAC play to finish in a tie for tenth place. They advanced to the quarterfinals of the MAAC tournament where they lost to Manhattan.

Roster

Schedule

|-
!colspan=9 style="background:#E51837; color:#FFFFFF;"| Regular season

|-
!colspan=9 style="background:#E51837; color:#FFFFFF;"| MAAC tournament

See also
2015–16 Marist Red Foxes women's basketball team

References

Marist Red Foxes men's basketball seasons
Marist